Homer T. Putnal (September 25, 1907 – April 29, 1987) was an American politician in the state of Florida.  He served in the Florida House of Representatives from 1951 to 1966.

References

1907 births
1987 deaths
Members of the Florida House of Representatives
People from Lafayette County, Florida

20th-century American politicians